Pyramimonadales are an order of green algae in the Chlorophyta. The chloroplasts of phototrophic euglenids probably came from endosymbiosis with a member of this order.

Taxonomy
 Family Polyblepharidaceae Dangeard 1888
 Genus Amphoraemonas Szabados 1948
 Genus Chloraster Ehrenberg 1848 non Haworth 1824
 Genus Gyromitus Skuja 1939
 Genus Korschikoffia Pascher 1927
 Genus Polyblepharides Dangeard 1888
 Genus Printziella Skvortzov 1958
 Genus Stephanoptera Dangeard 1910
 Genus Sycamina van Tieghem 1880
 Family Pterospermataceae Lohmann 1904
 Genus Polyasterias Meunier 1910
 Genus Pterosperma Pouchet 1893
 Family Pyramimonadaceae Korshikov 1938 [Halosphaeraceae Haeckel 1894]
 Genus Angulomonas Skvortzov 1968
 Genus Coccopterum Silva 1970
 Genus Cymbomonas Schiller 1913
 Genus Halosphaera Schmitz 1879
 Genus Kuzminia Skvortzov 1958
 Genus Pocillomonas Steinecke 1926
 Genus Prasinochloris Belcher 1966
 Genus Protoaceromonas Skvortzov 1968
 Genus Protochroomonas Skvortzov 1968
 Genus Pyramimonas Schmarda 1849
 Genus Tasmanites E.T.Newton
 Genus Trichloridella Silva 1970

References

Chlorophyta orders
Pyramimonadophyceae